Reineris Salas Perez (born March 17, 1987 in Havana) is a male freestyle wrestler from Cuba. He is a two time World Freestyle Wrestling Championships silver medalist.

He represented Cuba at the 2020 Summer Olympics. He won the bronze medal in the men's freestyle 97 kg event.

He competed in the 125kg event at the 2022 World Wrestling Championships held in Belgrade, Serbia.

References

External links
 

Living people
1987 births
Cuban male sport wrestlers
Olympic wrestlers of Cuba
Wrestlers at the 2008 Summer Olympics
World Wrestling Championships medalists
Pan American Games gold medalists for Cuba
Pan American Games medalists in wrestling
Wrestlers at the 2015 Pan American Games
Wrestlers at the 2019 Pan American Games
Medalists at the 2015 Pan American Games
Medalists at the 2019 Pan American Games
Pan American Wrestling Championships medalists
Wrestlers at the 2016 Summer Olympics
Wrestlers at the 2020 Summer Olympics
Medalists at the 2020 Summer Olympics
Olympic bronze medalists for Cuba
Olympic medalists in wrestling

Sportspeople from Havana
20th-century Cuban people
21st-century Cuban people